Sari Amr (born 15 November 1989) is a professional Saudi Arabian football player who currently plays as a left back for Abha.

Honours
Al-Wehda
MS League: 2017–18

External links
 

Living people
1989 births
Association football defenders
Saudi Arabian footballers
Al-Wehda Club (Mecca) players
Al-Shabab FC (Riyadh) players
Al-Taawoun FC players
Abha Club players
Saudi First Division League players
Saudi Professional League players